Lyvonia Albert "Stump" Mitchell (born March 15, 1959) is an American football coach and former player who is the running backs coach for the Cleveland Browns of the National Football League (NFL). He served as head football coach at Morgan State University from 1996 to 1998 and Southern University from 2010 to 2012, compiling an overall college football record of 14–42. Mitchell played collegiately at The Citadel and thereafter was drafted by the St. Louis Cardinals. He was a running back and return specialist for the Cardinals from 1981 to 1989.

Early years
Mitchell's football career began at Camden County High School, Camden County, Georgia.  He played college football for The Citadel and holds school records for rushing yards in a season (1,647) and career (4,062).  A three-year starter at tailback, he was a two-time all Southern Conference selection. As a senior in 1980 he was the second leading rusher in NCAA Division I-A behind Heisman Trophy winner George Rogers and was named a Third-Team Associated Press All-American; he was named Southern Conference Player of the Year and the South Carolina Amateur Athlete of the Year.

Mitchell also participated in track and field competition at The Citadel, recording a 23-foot 3 inch jump in 1981.

Playing career
Mitchell was selected by the St. Louis Cardinals in the ninth round (226th pick overall) of the 1981 NFL Draft. As a 5'9", 188 lbs. running back, Mitchell played for the Cardinals from 1981 to 1989 and ended his NFL career with the Kansas City Chiefs in 1990; he made a brief comeback with the Arizona Rattlers of the Arena Football League in 1993. His best year as a pro was during the 1985 season when he rushed for 1,006 yards and seven touchdowns, while also contributing 502 yards and 3 touchdowns as a receiver. In 10 NFL seasons he rushed 986 times for 4,647 yards and scored 32 touchdowns, he has the second most all purpose yards in Cardinals franchise history with 11,985 behind only Larry Fitzgerald.

Coaching career
Mitchell served as head coach at Casa Grande Union High School in Casa Grande, Arizona from 1993 to 1994. He was the head coach at Morgan State University from 1996 to 1998, compiling a record of 8–24. He served as the running backs coach for the Seattle Seahawks from 1999 to 2007 then was brought by new head coach Jim Zorn to the Washington Redskins staff in 2008 serving as Running Backs Coach and Assistant Head Coach. Mitchell accepted the head coaching position at Southern University on January 11, 2010. During his first season, Mitchell led Southern to a 2–9 record. In 2011, the Jaguars finished with a 4–7 record.

To start off the 2012 season, Southern suffered a 66–21 loss to the New Mexico Lobos. After that defeat, the Jaguars returned home for a Thursday home game against Mississippi Valley State which aired nationally on ESPNU. Southern was upset 6–0 by Valley in that contest. The next day Mitchell was reassigned to another position within the University, ending his tenure as Southern's head coach after only 24 games. He finished with a 6–18 overall record. Defensive coordinator Dawson Odums was named as the interim coach of the Jaguars.

Mitchell joined the Arizona Cardinals as the running backs coach in 2013, and was with the team for four seasons before leaving the team in January 2017. He was signed to be the New York Jets' running backs coach in February 2017. In 2019, Mitchell joined the Cleveland Browns as the running backs coach. In 2020 even with the Browns’ head coaching change Stump was retained as the running backs coach.

Personal life
Mitchell is a member of Omega Psi Phi fraternity. His older brother called him "Stump", because he was never intimidated by playing with kids bigger than he was.

Head coaching record

College

Notes

References

External links
 

1959 births
Living people
American football running backs
Arizona Cardinals coaches
Arizona Rattlers players
Cleveland Browns coaches
Morgan State Bears football coaches
New York Jets coaches
Phoenix Cardinals players
San Antonio Riders coaches
Seattle Seahawks coaches
Southern Jaguars football coaches
St. Louis Cardinals (football) players
The Citadel Bulldogs football players
The Citadel Bulldogs men's track and field athletes
Washington Redskins coaches
High school football coaches in Arizona
People from Kingsland, Georgia
Coaches of American football from Georgia (U.S. state)
Players of American football from Georgia (U.S. state)
African-American coaches of American football
African-American players of American football
20th-century African-American sportspeople
21st-century African-American sportspeople
Ed Block Courage Award recipients